Yours Truly Forever is the debut studio album by American rapper Phora. It was released on August 18, 2017, through Warner Bros. Records.

Background
Speaking about the album, Phora said "I feel like all types of music definitely helps people, but music that specifically and especially covers topics such as suicide — and that can be a very touchy topic — but songs that cover suicide, depression, family issues, even abuse, things like that, I feel like that’s very important, most of all to make people not feel like they’re alone." The album contains 16 songs, announced by Phora. Phora stated he wanted the album to connect with the fans and want them to listen to it and be able to relate.

Track listing

Personnel
Credits for Yours Truly Forever adapted from Allmusic.

 Marco Archer – Composer
 Tom Bailey – Composer, Vocals (Background)
 Anthro Beats – Mixing, Musician, Producer, Programmer
 Asia Bryant – Composer
 Cardiak – Producer
 Deadxbeat – Producer
 Uforo Ebong – Composer
 Eskupe – Musician, Producer, Programmer
 Tiffany Evans – Composer, Featured Artist
 Adam Feeney – Composer
 Larry Griffin, Jr. – Composer
 Alex Isley – Composer, Vocals (Background)
 George Keane – Composer
 Carl McCormick – Composer
 Phora – Mastering, Mixing, Primary Artist, Recording, Vocals
 Anthony Ruiz – Composer
 S1 – Producer
 Swiff D – Producer
 Adrian Velasquez – Composer
 Toby Woodcock – Composer

Charts

References

2017 debut albums
Warner Records albums
Albums produced by Symbolyc One
Albums produced by Cardiak